Karl Friedrich Eichhorn (20 November 1781 – 4 July 1854) was a German jurist.

Eichhorn was born in Jena as the son of Johann Gottfried Eichhorn. He entered the University of Göttingen in 1797. In 1805 he obtained the professorship of law at Frankfurt (Oder), holding it until 1811, when he accepted the same chair at the new Friedrich Wilhelm University in Berlin. On the call to arms in 1813 he became a captain of horse, and received the Iron Cross at the end of the war.

In 1817 he was offered the chair of law at Göttingen, and, preferring it to the Berlin professorship, taught there with great success until ill-health compelled him to resign in 1828. His successor in the Berlin chair having died in 1832, he again entered on its duties, but resigned two years afterwards. In 1832 he also received an appointment in the ministry of foreign affairs, which, with his labours on many state committees and his legal researches and writings, occupied him until his death at Cologne.

Eichhorn was regarded as one of the principal authorities on German constitutional law. His chief work is Deutsche Staats- und Rechtsgeschichte (Göttingen, 1808– 1823, 5th ed. 1843–1844). In company with Friedrich Carl von Savigny and Johann Friedrich Ludwig Göschen he founded the Zeitschrift für geschichtliche Rechtswissenschaft. He was the author besides of Einleitung in des deutsche Privatrecht mit Einschluss des Lehnrechts (Gött., 1823) and the Grundsätze des Kirchenrechts der Katholischen und der Evangelischen Religionspartei in Deutschland, 2 Bde. (ib., 1831– 1833).

Awards and decorations
 Iron Cross of 1813
 Pour le Mérite for Arts and Sciences (1842)
 Order of the Red Eagle (Prussia, 1847)
 Maximilian Order for Science and Art (Bavaria, 1853)

Notes

References
  This work in turn cites:
 Karl Friedrich Schulte, Karl Friedrich Eichhorn, sein Leben und Wirken (1884) at Google Books.

See also
German Historical School of Law

External links
 Karl Friedrich von Eichhorn, Prussian Minister of Religious and Educational Affairs, to the Prussian Interior Minister Count von Arnim (June 7, 1844)
 Zeitschrift für geschichtliche Rechtswissenschaft (1848) at Google Books.

1781 births
1854 deaths
Writers from Jena
Jurists from Thuringia
German military personnel of the Napoleonic Wars
People from Saxe-Weimar
Recipients of the Iron Cross (1813)
Recipients of the Pour le Mérite (civil class)
University of Göttingen alumni
Academic staff of the University of Göttingen
Academic staff of European University Viadrina
Academic staff of the Humboldt University of Berlin